Bihar Times is an online Web portal based in Bihar region, India. It was launched on 8 November 1999.

References

External links 

Internet properties established in 1999
Mass media in Bihar
Indian news websites
Companies based in Patna
1999 establishments in Bihar